John Holles, 2nd Earl of Clare (13 June 1595 – 2 January 1666) was an English nobleman.

Family
Holles was born in Haughton, Nottinghamshire, the eldest son of John Holles, 1st Earl of Clare and Anne Stanhope, and the brother of Denzil Holles, 1st Baron Holles.

Holles married Elizabeth Vere, daughter of Horace Vere, 1st Baron Vere of Tilbury, on 4 September 1626. They had eight children:
John Holles, died young
Gilbert Holles, 3rd Earl of Clare (1633–1689)
Lady Anne Holles (d. October 1707), married Edward Clinton, Lord Clinton
Lady Elizabeth Holles, married Wentworth FitzGerald, 17th Earl of Kildare
Lady Arabella Holles, married Sir Edward Rossiter of Somerley
Lady Susan Holles (c. 1641 – bef May 1710), married c. July 1663 Sir John Lort, 2nd Baronet
Lady Diana Holles, married Harry Bridges of Keynsham
Lady Penelope Holles (d. 1684), married on 13 April 1667 Sir James Langham, 2nd Baronet
Lady Eleanor Holles (b. 18 Apr 1636 d. 1709), whose will endowed Lady Eleanor Holles School.

Holles is buried in St. Mary's Church, Nottingham.

Life
Styled Lord Haughton from 1624, he was member of parliament for East Retford in three parliaments (1623–1626) before succeeding to the peerage in 1637. 

During the Thirty Years’ War, at the siege of Bois-le-Duc in 1629, he served as a volunteer under the command of his father-in-law, Horace Vere, 1st Baron Vere of Tilbury.

Although he had quarrelled with Thomas Wentworth, 1st Earl of Strafford, who had married his sister, Arabella, in 1641 he opposed the Earl of Strafford's impeachment in the House of Lords, and during the trial asked several questions favourable to his defence. After  Parliament sentenced Strafford to death by attainder, he pleaded hard with King Charles I for Strafford's life, but without success.

He took some part in the Civil War, but "he was very often of both parties, and never advantaged either". His attitude has been described as one of "dubious neutrality". He was made Recorder of Nottingham in 1642. After the Restoration, he gained a pardon from King Charles II.

References

1595 births
1666 deaths
English MPs 1624–1625
English MPs 1625
English MPs 1626
Burials in Nottinghamshire
Earls of Clare